Phyllocoma (Galfridus) speciosa is a species of sea snail, a marine gastropod mollusk in the family Muricidae, the murex snails or rock snails.

Subspecies
 Phyllocoma (Galfridus) speciosa eburnea (Petterd, 1884) 
 Phyllocoma (Galfridus) speciosa speciosa (Angas, 1871) 
 Phyllocoma (Galfridus) speciosa virginalis (Suter, 1913)

Description
The shell size is between 12 mm and 20 mm

Distribution
This species occurs in Australian waters along Queensland and New South Wales, Victoria and Tasmania and along New Zealand

References

External links
 Adams A. (1864 ["1863"]). Description of a new genus and twelve new species of Mollusca. Proceedings of the Zoological Society of London. (1863): 506–509
 Angas G.F. (1871) Description of thirty-four new species of shells from Australia. Proceedings of the Zoological Society of London, 1871: 13–21, pl. 1

Muricidae